The 1982 Avon Championships of Houston  was a women's tennis tournament played on indoor carpet courts at the Summit in Houston, Texas in the United States that was part of the 1982 Avon Championships Circuit. It was the 12th edition of the tournament and was held from February 15 through February 21, 1982. Third-seeded Bettina Bunge won the singles title and earned $22,000 first-prize money.

Finals

Singles
 Bettina Bunge defeated  Pam Shriver 6–2, 3–6, 6–2
 It was Bunge's 1st singles title of her career.

Doubles
 Kathy Jordan /  Pam Shriver defeated  Sue Barker /  Sharon Walsh 7–6(8–6), 6–2

Prize money

References

External links
 International Tennis Federation (ITF) tournament edition details

Avon Championships of Houston
Virginia Slims of Houston
Avon Championships of Houston
Avon Championships of Houston
Avon Championships of Houston
Avon Championships of Houston